Larissa Kapitonova  (born 4 May 1970) is a former Russian footballer who played as a goalkeeper for the Russia women's national football team. She was part of the team at the 1999 FIFA Women's World Cup and the UEFA Women's Euro 2001.

References

External links
 

1970 births
Living people
Soviet women's footballers
Russian women's footballers
Russia women's international footballers
People from Cheboksary
Sportspeople from Chuvashia
1999 FIFA Women's World Cup players
Women's association football goalkeepers
FC Energy Voronezh players
Ryazan-VDV players
Russian Women's Football Championship players